Carencro High School is a Lafayette Parish high school located in  Lafayette, Louisiana, United States. Carencro High School is one of six Lafayette Parish Public High Schools. Geographically, the school is located approximately 3.5 miles north of Interstate 10 and approximately one mile west of Interstate 49. The current school administrative team consists of Vanessa Knott, Principal, and Assistant Principals, Claire Leger and Mary Qualey.

School history
Carencro High School started as Carencro School in 1874, then moved to what is now Carencro Middle School. The present-day Carencro High School began construction in 1969. Today, the main buildings include Building 1 (Office & Cafeteria), Building 2, Building 3 (Little Theater, Band, & Chorus), Building 4 (Agriculture/Home Economics), Building 5 (known as Boys' Gym), Building 6 (known as Girls' Gym), Building 7, and Building 8 (portable classrooms).

Feeder schools
Students that attend Carencro High School come from several different feeder schools: Acadian Middle, Carencro Middle, L.J. Alleman Middle, N.P. Moss Middle, Paul Breaux Middle, Scott Middle, Carencro Catholic, Immaculate Heart, Stem Magnet Academy, and St. Leo Seton.

Athletics
Carencro High athletics competes in the LHSAA.

Carencro High School is home to many sports organizations including: Baseball, Basketball, Bowling, Cross Country, Football, Golf, Soccer, Softball, Swimming, Tennis, Track & Field, Volleyball, and Wrestling.

Championships
Football championships
(2) State Championships: 1992, 2020

Notable alumni
Marc Broussard, American singer/songwriter.
Kevin Faulk, retired New England Patriots running back and three time Super Bowl Champion (2001,2003,2004)
Ron Guidry, former MLB player and MLB Hall of Fame inductee. (New York Yankees)
Wade Richey, San Francisco 49ers, San Diego Charges, & Baltimore Ravens kicker

References

http://www.lpssonline.com
http://www.carencrohighschool.org

External links
http://www.lpssonline.com - Lafayette Parish School System

Public high schools in Louisiana
Schools in Lafayette, Louisiana
1874 establishments in Louisiana
Educational institutions established in 1874